Omar Ba (born 3 December 1949) is a Senegalese sprinter. He competed in the men's 4 × 400 metres relay at the 1972 Summer Olympics.

References

1949 births
Living people
Athletes (track and field) at the 1972 Summer Olympics
Senegalese male sprinters
Olympic athletes of Senegal
Place of birth missing (living people)